The 1946 New Jersey gubernatorial election was held on November 5, 1946. Republican Alfred E. Driscoll defeated Democratic nominee Lewis G. Hansen with 57.08% of the vote.

For the last time, the Governor of New Jersey was elected to a three-year term. Afterwards, New Jersey governors would be elected for terms of four years. This is the last time a Republican was elected to succeed another Republican as Governor of New Jersey.

Primary elections
Primary elections were held on June 4, 1946.

Democratic primary

Candidates
Lewis G. Hansen, former district court judge

Results

Republican primary

Candidates
Alfred E. Driscoll, former State Senator from Haddonfield
Harold G. Hoffman, former Governor

Results

General election

Candidates
Major party candidates
Alfred E. Driscoll, Republican
Lewis G. Hansen, Democratic

Other candidates
Alan Kohlman, Socialist Workers Party
Lawrence Mahan, Communist Party USA
Rubye Smith, Socialist Party of America
Robert L. Gittings, Anti Medical Trust Federation
George E. Bopp, Socialist Labor Party of America
John Binns, Prohibition Party

Results

References

1946
New Jersey
Gubernatorial
November 1946 events in the United States